Ouled Ben Abdelkader District is a district of Chlef Province, Algeria.

Communes 
The district is further divided into 2 communes:

 Ouled Ben Abdelkader --28 430
 El Hadjadj -- 8 478

References

Districts of Chlef Province